Talk to Me: Design and the Communication between People and Objects is an exhibition put on by the Museum of Modern Art from July 24 to November 7, 2011. Created by the Department of Architecture and Design, it was widely reviewed and drew many visitors. The exhibit was organized by Paola Antonelli, Senior Curator in the Department of Architecture and Kate Carmody, curatorial assistant. The exhibition explores and showcases the communications, dialogue and interface between people and machines.

Talk to Me features 194 works by 236 artists, some provide information, others act as gateways or interfaces, still others influences our lives in more subtle subliminal ways. Each object's label includes a QR Code allowing the visitor to view information on the piece's artist, background information on the piece, read tweets posted by other visitors related to the object and includes connections to other objects in the exhibition with similar themes, design or use.

Exhibition Categories
The exhibition is divided into five categories: Objects, Bodies, Life, City, and Worlds.

 Objects investigates objects, interfaces, and systems that are not just communicative and interactive but also have personalities. Some are conceptual—such as Kacie Kinzer’s Tweenbots, which demonstrate New Yorkers’ irrepressible impulse to help anything or anyone that seems to be lost, even if it is a cardboard robot carrying a little flag—and others functional and functioning, such as the interfaces for the ATM at Barclays or the MetroCard Vending Machine.
 Bodies focuses on the communication between people by means of objects. The human body and mind are the central agents and subjects of study in this chapter, expressing and explaining themselves in ways previously unthinkable.
 Designers search for the meaning of Life in their own empirical and suggestive ways.
 The City, with its density and complex infrastructures and systems relies on communication for its own sheer survival.  This chapter shows the changed role of designers—from creators of form and function to enablers, inspirers, and facilitators—in particular detail.
 In Worlds what most of these technologies have in common is the fact that they are based on systems and rely on network connections, just like the natural world, and understanding their design should be and often is a requirement for those building the elements that come together to constitute these physical and virtual worlds, from designers and architects to engineers and television executives. For those who are not willing or able to understand systems but still need access to them, there are interfaces that function as zones of engagement and exchange.

Art Works

 Cross-fire from the Natural Occurrence series (2010) is an animation directed by Geoffrey Mann and produced by Chris Labrooy. A dinner table is set with plates, cups, and silverware that have motion running through them while an audio that sounds like a general wife to husband argument plays. It is shown to  give you the impression of the sounds running through the table set up.
 Eyewriter (2009) is a display that shows video and visual examples of the connection between art and technology. It is based on a graffiti artist who goes by, Tempt1 who was diagnosed with ALS in 2003. It prevented him from being able to physically continue his art work in which he began to use new technology that allowed him to use his eye movements in order to continue creating.
 Animal Superpowers: Ant and Giraffe (2008) is a technology that gives a person the ability to have animal senses such as the Ant and/or Giraffe. This display shows a young girl wearing the device that allowed her to see like an ant, magnifying her vision 50 times to giving her the visual perspective of an ant. This display also contains the actual device for viewing purposes.
 Bat Billboard (2008) by Natalie Jeremijenko displays a picture of a billboard/ disease-free bat habitat in order to create a bridge between humans and bats. "The billboard inventively reclaims urban infrastructure for animal habitat and also functions as a public face for the bats, translating their habits and activities in a way that humans can understand."
 Notepad (2008) by Matt Kenyon and Douglas Easterly of S.W.A.M.P., with what looks like an ordinary yellow legal pad is revealed (when magnified) to be micro-printed text enumerating the full names, dates and locations of each Iraqi civilian death on record over the first three years of the Iraq War. Hundred of these notepads have been covertly distributed to US representatives and senators, as a sort of Trojan horse, injecting transgressive data straight into the halls of power and memorializing it in official archives.

References

External links
 Review NY Times
 Antonelli interview

Museum of Modern Art (New York City) exhibitions
2011 in art